Acrotylus longipes is a species of band-winged grasshopper in the family Acrididae. It is found in Europe, North Africa, and western Asia.

Subspecies
These three subspecies belong to the species Acrotylus longipes:
 Acrotylus longipes longipes (Charpentier, 1845)
 Acrotylus longipes rosea Bolívar, 1908
 Acrotylus longipes subfasciatus Bey-Bienko, 1948

References

External links

 

Oedipodinae
Palearctic insects
Insects described in 1845